Khunag (also Romanized as Khūnag; also known as Khonak, Khonk, and Khoonak) is a village in Sarbanan Rural District, in the Central District of Zarand County, Kerman Province, Iran. At the 2006 census, its population was 15, in 7 families.

References 

Populated places in Zarand County